Jonas Bloquet (born 10 July 1992) is a Belgian actor, known for his roles as Jonas in Private Lessons (2009), which earned him a Magritte Award nomination for Most Promising Actor, Vincent Leblanc in Elle (2016), for which he was nominated for a César Award for Most Promising Actor, and Maurice "Frenchie" Theriault in The Nun (2018).

Filmography

Actor

Director

Theater

Awards and nominations

References

External links

 
 
 
 

1992 births
Living people
21st-century French male actors
Belgian male film actors
Belgian male television actors
Male actors from Brussels